Pseudopostega machaerias is a moth of the family Opostegidae. It was described by Edward Meyrick in 1907. It is known from Maskeliya, Sri Lanka.

References

Opostegidae
Moths described in 1907